Sinawo Thambo is a South African politician from the Western Cape. As of 22 October 2020, he is a Member of the National Assembly of South Africa representing the Economic Freedom Fighters. Tambo was the provincial chairperson of the EFF Student Command. In March 2022, he was redeployed to the position on National Spokesperson of the EFF.

Background
Tambo's family were African National Congress supporters. His father was an ANC politician. In 2021, Tambo graduated from the University of Cape Town with a Bachelor of Arts in English, Language and Literature & Politics and Governance.

Tambo had served as the provincial chairperson of the student command of the Economic Freedom Fighters. He is currently the national spokesperson of the party, having previously served as head of the presidency.

On 22 October 2020, he was sworn in as a Member of the National Assembly.

References

External links

Living people
Year of birth missing (living people)
People from the Western Cape
Politicians from Cape Town
Economic Freedom Fighters politicians
Members of the National Assembly of South Africa